Jalakbar (also Romanized as Jalākbar; also known as Chalageh, Chalakbar, Jalagbar, Jalakbarī, and Jalaqeh) is a village in Kuhpayeh Rural District, Nowbaran District, Saveh County, Markazi Province, Iran. At the 2006 census, its population was 155, in 76 families.

References 

Populated places in Saveh County